Petrophile canescens, commonly known as conesticks, is a species of flowering plant in the family Proteaceae and is endemic to eastern Australia. It is an erect shrub with pinnately-divided leaves and oval heads of hairy, white to pale cream-coloured flowers.

Description

This petrophile can be distinguished from the related Petrophile pulchella by its finely hairy new growth.

Taxonomy
Petrophile canescens was first formally described in 1830 by Robert Brown from an unpublished description by Allan Cunningham. Brown's description was published in the Supplementum to his Prodromus Florae Novae Hollandiae et Insulae Van Diemen. The specific epithet (canescens) means "becoming or being somewhat white or hoary".

Distribution and habitat
Conesticks grows in forest and sandy heath on the Blackdown Tableland in Queensland and south to Nerriga and as far west as Warialda in New South Wales.

References

canescens
Flora of New South Wales
Flora of Queensland
Plants described in 1830
Taxa named by Allan Cunningham (botanist)